Burmo-Tai, Tai-Burmans or Burmese Tai peoples is an ethnic designation of peoples living in Burma who are related to the Tai-Kadai ethnic group. 
The following is a list of Tai ethnic groups within the political borders of Burma:
Tai Yai (including the Khamti people)
Dai (including the Lu people)
Lao
Tai Khun
Tai Yong
Tai Nuea (including the Tai Mao people)
Tai Laeng
Tai Phake
Tai Piw
Nara
Tenasserim Thai
Thai Yuan
Thai people 

Tai peoples
Ethnic groups in Myanmar